Tefta Cami Cani (born August 15, 1940) is an Albanian politician of the Albanian Party of Labour. She served as a Minister of Culture and Minister of Education, Sports and Youth at the same time from 1976 to 1987.

Early life and education 
Tefta Cami was born on August, 15, 1940 in Diber, Albania. Her father Ahmet Cani was a partisan.

In 1959 she graduated from the pedagogical school in Peshkopi and on 1964 she graduated in Tirana for Albania Language and Literature. In 1972 she completed the senior philosophy course and in 1988 the scientific degree "Candidate of Sciences"

Career 
From 1964 to 1967 she served as a director and deputy director in pedagogical high school "Demir Gashi" in Peshkopi. In 1970 she became a member and secretary of Albanian Party of Labour in Tirane. In 1976 Enver Hoxha appointed her as Minister of Culture and Education until 1987, two years after his death.

Personal life 
After her removal from office, Tefta became a school principal again from 1987 to 1991. From 1993 to 2006 she became association president and board chair of an art high school. She married doctor Medi Cami.

References 

1940 births
Living people
20th-century Albanian politicians
20th-century Albanian women politicians
Labour Party of Albania politicians
Sports ministers of Albania
Government ministers of Albania
Women government ministers of Albania
Members of the Parliament of Albania
Women members of the Parliament of Albania
People from Dibër County
Youth ministers of Albania
Education ministers of Albania
Culture ministers of Albania